Patanjali Yogpeeth is a yoga institute located in Haridwar, Uttarakhand, India. Founded in 2006 and named after the Rishi Patanjali, the purpose of the institute is to practice, research, and develop yoga and ayurveda. The institute is the flagship project of the yoga teacher and entrepreneur Ramdev.

The Patanjali Yogpeeth houses a hospital, pharmacy and several Patanjali trusts. It is also the home of the University of Patanjali and the Yog Gram ashram. Balkrishna is the General Secretary of Patanjali Yogpeeth. Ramdev is the Vice-Chancellor of the Patanjali Yogapeeth.

In 2017, the Income Tax Appellate Tribunal (ITAT) gave tax exempt status to Patanjali Yogpeeth through its Delhi bench. Located on the Haridwar-Delhi highway, the institute offers treatments for all and has residential accommodations.

Patanjali Yogpeeth Trust
Patanjali Yogpeeth Trust, a non-profit organisation started by Ramdev, aims to carry out welfare activities in the spheres of health care, education and other socio-economic activities. Patanjali drives its social responsibility initiatives through the Patanjali Yogpeeth Trust.

University of Patanjali

University of Patanjali is located in Haridwar, Uttarakhand. It was established in 2006.

Patanjali Yogpeeth comprises two campuses, named Patanjali Yogpeeth - I and Patanjali Yogpeeth - II respectively.

Patanjali Yogpeeth - I

This first Yogpeeth campus was commissioned on 6 April 2006.

 In 2010, the Patanjali Ayurveda College study and research facility was commissioned as part of the university. The campus library has a special area dedicated to the research of yoga and ayurveda. Various ancient books are being restored and digitized.

Patanjali Yogpeeth - II
This second Yogpeeth campus was inaugurated in April 2009.

 Patanjali Yog Bhavan Patanjali Yog Bhavan is a huge auditorium of 200,000 sq. ft. where thousands of participants practice yoga, pranayama and meditation together.
 Shraddhalayam is a 60,000 sq. ft. air conditioned auditorium.
 Panchakarma & Shatkarma Centre  is a 40,000 sq. ft. centre where up to about 1,000 people can perform and participate in panchakarma and shatkarma therapy.

Acharyakulam

Acharyakulam is a school based on Vedic-cum-modern education near Patanjali Yogpeeth, Haridwar. It is a residential educational institution for students from grades 5th to 12th. It was inaugurated on 26 April 2013 by Narendra Modi, the then Chief Minister of Gujarat. This organization is jointly governed by Ramdev and Balkrishna.

It is affiliated to Central Board of Secondary Education (CBSE).

Ramdev's main aim behind opening Acharyakulam was to promote Vedic education and Indian culture. He believed establishing Acharyaklam will help to protect the culture of India and promote Vedic knowledge to new generations of Indians. He plans to establish Acharyakulam in every district of the country.

Admission

The admissions examination happens in December. The examination happens for the fifth class. The selected students are tested again for a week in Acharyakulam. 80 boys and 40 successful girls get the admission after that  their further education continues until 12th standard.
 
Ramdev plans to establish 600 schools in 600 districts across the country. Apart from Indian culture, Sanskrit and Yoga, it will also provide education in modern science. In 2018 Ayush Sharma and Yuvraj Aaditya Arya received overall 99% and 98% respectively in class 10 CBSE Board exams.

On 27 September 2018, Amit Shah, Trivendra Singh Rawat and Ramdev inaugurated new premises of Acharyakulam near Patanjali Yogpeeth Phase-1.

Yog Gram
Yog Gram is an ashram run by Patanjali Yogpeeth. A natural health center that was built in 2009 at the ashram suffered a fire in 2020. It maintains a natural environment. It provides physical, mental and spiritual health treatments through the integrated therapy of Ayurveda.

The concept of Yog Gram is from Ramdev and his associate Balkrishna. It was inaugurated by former Chief Minister of Uttarakhand B. C. Khanduri on 8 June 2008. In 2015, expansion work began in Tirupati. In 2019, Yog Gram expanded to serve 600 patients from 300.

Yog Gram was described as Adarsh village, with the following facilities.
 Naturopathy
Yoga
Meditation
Panchkarma 
Shatkarma
Gaushala (Cowshed)

Controversies

Ramdev's comments against modern medicine 
In May 2021, Ramdev sparked controversy when he spoke against modern medical science in the context of COVID-19 pandemic in India. The Indian Medical Association (IMA) objected to his comments. On 27 May, Patanjali Yogpeeth confirmed that it had received the defamation notice from IMA demanding an apology from Ramdev over his remarks. In a statement, the institute quoting Balkrishna said it would give a befitting reply legally to IMA. The institute claimed that all of its activities are carried out with scientific and truthful temperament. It said it "cannot allow anyone to disparage, neglect and demean the great knowledge and science of rishis and scriptures".

References

Sources
 Telles et al. (2013): "Patanjali Yogpeeth, Haridwar: An Ayurveda center which includes treatment, research, and education", J Ayurveda Integr Med 2013 Apr-Jun; 4(2): 120–122.

External links

 

Private universities in India
Universities in Uttarakhand
Haridwar district
Educational institutions established in 2006
2006 establishments in Uttarakhand
Ramdev
Yoga schools
Yoga organizations
Ayurvedic organisations
Naturopathy
Patanjali Ayurved